Two ships of the United States Navy have been named Alikula Bay for one of bays on Coronation Island in Alaska.

  was a separate Casablanca-class escort carrier, launched on 18 April 1944, then renamed  on 16 May 1944.

Sources

United States Navy ship names